Perry Township is one of the eighteen townships of Monroe County, Ohio, United States. As of the 2010 census, the population was 451, including 86 people in the village of Antioch.

Geography
Located in the southern part of the county, it borders the following townships:
Center Township - north
Green Township - northeast
Jackson Township - southeast
Benton Township - south
Washington Township - west
Wayne Township - northwest

The village of Antioch is located in central Perry Township.

Name and history
It is one of twenty-six Perry Townships statewide.

Government
The township is governed by a three-member board of trustees, who are elected in November of odd-numbered years to a four-year term beginning on the following January 1. Two are elected in the year after the presidential election and one is elected in the year before it. There is also an elected township fiscal officer, who serves a four-year term beginning on April 1 of the year after the election, which is held in November of the year before the presidential election. Vacancies in the fiscal officership or on the board of trustees are filled by the remaining trustees.

References

External links
County website

Townships in Monroe County, Ohio
Townships in Ohio